Euphoberiidae is an extinct family of archipolypodan millipedes known from the Upper Pennsylvanian of Europe and North America.

Description
Euphoberiids are characterized by sets of outward-pointing spines on each diplosegment (body ring), one pair extending laterally (to the sides), the other pair higher on the body.  At the base of each lateral spine is an ozopore, or defensive gland opening. Species of Acantherpestes and  Euphoberia have cylindrical bodies, while those of Myriacantherpestes are more flattened in appearance.

References

Millipede families
Carboniferous myriapods
Pennsylvanian first appearances
Pennsylvanian extinctions
Prehistoric arthropod families